Annexing Bill is a 1918 American silent romantic comedy film directed by Albert Parker and starring Gladys Hulette, Creighton Hale and Kate Lester.

Cast
 Gladys Hulette as 	Enid Barwell
 Creighton Hale as 	Billy
 Mark Smith as 	George Frayne
 Margaret Greene as 	Mrs. Frayne
 Kate Lester as Enid's Aunt - Imposter

References

Bibliography
 Connelly, Robert B. The Silents: Silent Feature Films, 1910-36, Volume 40, Issue 2. December Press, 1998.

External links
 

1910s American films
1918 films
1918 comedy films
1910s English-language films
American silent feature films
Silent American comedy films
American black-and-white films
Films directed by Albert Parker
Pathé Exchange films